Kilsmo is a locality situated in Örebro Municipality, Örebro County, Sweden with 263 inhabitants in 2010.

Riksdag elections

References 

Örebro
Populated places in Örebro Municipality